The Mugabe family is a Zimbabwean family. Many of its members are involved in politics and business. It includes former president Robert Mugabe and former first lady Grace Mugabe.

Members 

 Robert Mugabe (21 February 1924 – 6 September 2019), revolutionary, Prime Minister of Zimbabwe from 1980 to 1987, President from 1987 to 201 leader of the Zimbabwe African National Union from 1975 to 1980 and leader of ZANU – Patriotic Front from 1980 to 2017.
 Sarah Francesca "Sally" Mugabe (née Hayfron; born 6 June 1931 Gold Coast, Ghana, died 27 January 1992) first wife of Robert, First Lady of Zimbabwe from 1987 to 1992.
 Nhamodzenyika Mugabe (1963 – 1966) Robert's first son, born in Ghana to mother Sally, died three years later of malaria.
 Grace Mugabe (née Ntombizodwa; born 23 July 1965) entrepreneur, politician a First Lady of Zimbabwe from 1996 to 2017
 Russell Goreraza (born 1984) son of Grace and Stanley Goreraza.
 Robert Mugabe junior, second son of Robert and Grace, fashion designer, born c. 1992
 Bellarmine Chatunga Mugabe, youngest son of Robert and Grace
 Bona Mugabe (born 18 April 1988), the only daughter of Robert and Grace, business person

Offices held 

 Prime Minister of Zimbabwe, 1980 – 1987
 President of Zimbabwe, 1987 – 2017
 Zimbabwe African National Union leader, 1975 – 1980
 ZANU – Patriotic Front leader, 1980 – 2017
 First Lady of Zimbabwe, 1987 – 1992 and 1996 – 2017

References 

Political families
Zimbabwean politicians
First families of Zimbabwe
Robert Mugabe